John Parks may refer to:
 John Alexander Parks, British painter
 John Michael Parks, Canadian politician

See also
 John Park (disambiguation)